There are at least two music festivals with this name:

Lincoln, Nebraska has had one since around 1992
Norman, Oklahoma has had one since 1984